Drebach is a municipality in the district of Erzgebirgskreis, in Saxony, Germany. It consists of the Ortsteile (divisions) Drebach, Grießbach, Im Grund, Scharfenstein, Spinnerei, Venusberg, Wilischthal and Wiltzsch.

Sights

Scharfenstein Castle 
Scharfenstein Castle is located in the Village of Scharfenstein in the valley of the river Zschopau. It houses, amongst other things, a permanent exhibition of Ore Mountain folk art under the title Longing For the Light (Sehnsucht nach dem Licht) by Hamburg collector, Andreas Martin, and a number of craftsmen's workshops.

References 

Erzgebirgskreis